Zuccone may refer to:

Zuccone, 15th century sculpture by Donatello
Corno Zuccone, a mountain of Lombardy, Italy
Zuccone star system, one of the Features of the Marvel Universe

See also
Zucco (disambiguation)
Zucconi (disambiguation)
Zucchini (disambiguation)